Lambert Sonna Momo (born 1970 in Yaoundé) is a Swiss computer scientist of Cameroonian origin. He is known for his work in electronic identification and authentication through biometrics.

Education 
After obtaining a bachelor's degree in mathematics at the University of Yaoundé in 1993, he continued his studies with two master's degrees at the EPFL in Lausanne in software engineering (2001) and in information systems (2003).

He obtained his doctorate in information and security systems at the University of Lausanne in 2008 for a thesis on "Elaboration de tableaux de bord SSI dynamiques: une approche à base d'ontologies" (Developing dynamic ISS dashboards: an ontology-based approach) under supervision of Solange Ghernaouti-Hélie.

Career

Academic career 
Until 2014, he taught at University of Lausanne on topics related to computer security and the protection of private data.

In 2016, he assembled a multidisciplinary team composed of biometrics specialist Sébastien Marcel at Idiap Research Institute; cryptographer Serge Vaudenay, director of the EPFL's Security and Cryptography Laboratory, electronics engineer  Pierre Roduit at HES SO Valais Wallis, and microtechnologist Eric Grenet at Swiss Centre for Electronics and Microtechnology. This team jointly developed BioID and BioLocker, a patented biometric authentication technology based on multi-view vein scanningthat combines data security and respect for private sphere protection.

Entrepreneurship 
He is the founder of GLOBAL ID SA, a spin-off of EPFL that brings vein-based biometric authentication technology to the market.

The biometric technology based on vein recognition is considered ethical because the key is hidden and therefore impossible to steal; the encryption is done end-to-end with a random code that changes constantly.

The contactless scanner is under development and the project has received a grant of 1 million from the Swiss Confederation.

Lambert Sonna Momo is the Inventor of the VenoScanner.

Publications

References

External links 
 Website of Global-ID
 Website of Idiap Research Institute
 Website of LASEC-EPFL

1970 births
Living people
École Polytechnique Fédérale de Lausanne alumni
University of Lausanne
Yaounde II
People from Yaoundé